Enxalé is a village in the Oio Region of western-central Guinea-Bissau. It lies near the confluence of the Geba and Corubal rivers.

Notable people
 Sana Na N'Hada (1950–) — film director

References

External links
Maplandia World Gazetteer

Populated places in Guinea-Bissau
Oio Region